The Undertakers sketch (written by Graham Chapman and John Cleese) is a comedy sketch from the 26th episode of Monty Python's Flying Circus, entitled "Royal Episode 13". It was the final sketch of the thirteenth and final episode of the second season, and was perhaps the most notorious of the Python team's television sketches.

Plot
The sketch begins when a quietly spoken man (Cleese) takes his dead mother to an undertakers' office. The tactless undertaker (Chapman) suggests they can "burn 'er, bury 'er, or dump 'er in the Thames", but rules out the last option after Cleese confirms that he liked his mother. Of the other two, the undertaker says both are "nasty" and describes the sordid details. When the son shows the undertaker his mother's body, which is in a sack, he sees that the dead woman "looks quite young". He tells his assistant, Fred (Eric Idle) that he thinks they've "got an eater", to which Fred responds that he'll get the oven warm. The grieving son is shocked by the idea of eating his mother's corpse, but eventually succumbs to "feeling a bit peckish". He still feels uneasy, but when the undertaker suggests digging a grave for him to throw up into (in case he feels "a bit guilty afterwards"), he agrees.

Production

The BBC were wary of the sketch, and reluctantly agreed to let it go ahead on the condition that the studio audience were heard to protest loudly, then invade the set at the sketch's conclusion. This was poorly executed: the audience began booing and shouting too early (those who were not heckling were laughing), and because of studio fire regulations, only a limited section of the crowd were allowed to rush onto the studio floor; the rest simply sat there looking awkward. (As Roger Wilmut pointed out in the book From Fringe To Flying Circus, a genuinely shocked (British) audience would have reacted with an embarrassed silence.)

Following its initial broadcast of the sketch in 1970, the BBC wiped the sketch from the master tape and replaced it with the "Spot the Braincell" sketch from episode 7 of the second series ("The Attila the Hun Show"). However, when the second series was released on BBC Video in 1985, episode 13 was "restored", thanks to the discovery of a (low quality) copy of the sketch that appears to be sourced from either an off-air recording of a foreign duplicate of the original show, or possibly Terry Jones' own home tape copy. This restored episode was finally shown again on television in 1987 as part of a complete (if frequently interrupted) run of second and third series repeats.

Context
The sketch was part of a longer running joke within the episode, which was that they expected Queen Elizabeth II to watch the show at some point. Having had interjections throughout the show ("She's switched to ITV!"), the final scene, after the desultory audience invasion, has the entire studio coming to a halt (including the portion of the audience that had rushed the stage) and standing at attention while the music to "God Save the Queen" is played, and the end credits roll.

To juxtapose the joke that the Queen would be watching, the episode also deliberately featured many of Monty Python's most tasteless sketches. This sketch, the last in both the episode and the second series, immediately followed the "Lifeboat sketch" (also about cannibalism) and some graphically cannibalistic animation from Terry Gilliam. Nevertheless, it was this sketch which was most notorious for its tastelessness, and Cleese made specific reference to it alone in his eulogy for Chapman, when recalling Chapman's talent for pushing the boundaries of bad taste.

Miscellany
This sketch should not be confused with the "Undertakers film" from episode 11 of series 1. The Undertakers film showed, in several snippets throughout the episode, a team of increasingly fatigued undertakers struggling to carry a coffin through the streets.

An audio version of the sketch, minus audience interruptions, was recorded in 1971 for the team's second album Another Monty Python Record.

References

Monty Python sketches
Fiction about death
Black comedy
Fiction about funerals
Cannibalism in fiction
Fictional undertakers